Paek Se-bong (born 1938) is a North Korean politician. Paek is a former member of the National Defence Commission of North Korea. He was named to the position in 2003, in a general reshuffling which saw the removal of older members including Ri Ul-sol and Kim Chol-man. Some have speculated that he is actually Kim Jong-chol, son of Kim Jong-il.

See also
Politics of North Korea

References

Yonhap News Agency.  "Who's who, North Korea," pp. 787–812 in 

Workers' Party of Korea politicians
Living people
Place of birth missing (living people)
1938 births